This is a list of ambassadors of Algeria to Pakistan. The current ambassador is Brahim Romani. The ambassador is based at the Algerian embassy in Islamabad and is concurrently accredited as a non-resident ambassador to Bangladesh.

List of ambassadors
The following is a partial list of Algerian ambassadors to Pakistan:
 Mohamed Messaoud Kellou (1961–1962)
 S. Sekkion (1965)
 Seedi Bin Abdul Rahman (1971)
 Ahmed Tewfik El Madani (1971)
 Brahim Ghafa (1984–1986)
 Abdelhamid Senouci Bereksi (1988)
 Muhi Al-Din Amimour (1989–1992)
 Aissa Seferdjeli (2003)
 Nadir Larbaoui (2004–2008)
 Ahmed Benflis (2009–2015)
 Lakhal Benkelai (2015–2021)
 Brahim Romani (2021–present)

References

 
Algeria
Pakistan